Adriana Barraza González (born 5 March 1956) is a Mexican actress, acting teacher, and director.

In 1999 director Alejandro González Iñárritu cast her as the mother of Gael García Bernal's character in Amores perros, which was nominated for the Academy Award for Best Foreign Language Film. In 2006, she collaborated with Iñárritu again in Babel, for which she received a nomination for the Academy Award for Best Supporting Actress.

Barraza is known in Mexico as Master Barraza from her partnership with Mexican director Sergio Jiménez, known as El Profe. They created the Actors Workshop in Mexico City, teaching and developing their own version of Method acting. Barraza began her career directing telenovela episodes, the actors in which she would also coach. In the 1990s she decided to step in front of the camera.

She currently operates her own acting school located in Miami, Florida titled Adriana Barraza's Black Box. Instructors at the school include her husband Arnaldo and daughter Carolina.

Personal life
Barraza was born in Toluca, Estado de Mexico, the daughter of Celia (née González Flores) and Eduardo Barraza Carral, a farmer. Her mother died when she was ten years old from myocarditis, a heart condition. Barraza herself has experienced two heart attacks. She has a sister named Maria Eugenia Barraza and three brothers, Eduardo, Porfirio, and Jose.

She became pregnant at age 18 with her daughter, actress Carolina Valsagna b. 1975. The father of her daughter is not known, as he abandoned her. Her first husband was Carlos Valsagna, whom she married in 1978, and he adopted her daughter and gave her his name. Her second husband is Arnaldo Pipke. Barraza studied acting through the Fine Arts School at Autonomous University of Chihuahua.

Career
In 1985, Barraza moved to Mexico City, to work as a theatre director. Since 1985, Barraza has guest starred and directed the Mexican television show Mujer, Casos de la Vida Real, alongside host Silvia Pinal. She has also been a part of the telenovela ensembles of Bajo un Mismo Rostro playing Elvira, La Paloma as Madre Clara and Imperio de Cristal as Flora. In 1997 she took on the role of Nurse Clara Dominguez in Alguna Vez Tendremos Alas.

Barraza directed Locura de Amor (in which she also starred), Nunca Te Olvidare and El Manantial.

Barraza appeared in the films Henry Poole Is Here, Drag Me to Hell, And Soon the Darkness. In 2011, Barraza's latest films included From Prada to Nada and Thor (in which her part was cut down). She had a recurring role as Guadalupe Elizalde, on the FX television series The Strain. In 2014 she starred in the film Cake opposite Jennifer Aniston.

She is also a professional acting coach and has worked with actors for a number of films and television shows, including the American film Spanglish. Barraza worked for Telemundo as an acting instructor, teaching accents to actors and actresses from all over Latin America, giving them a more Mexican lilt and sound appropriate for their character.

Filmography

Awards and nominations

References

External links
 

1956 births
Living people
Actresses from the State of Mexico
20th-century Mexican actresses
21st-century Mexican actresses
People from Toluca
Mexican film actresses
Mexican telenovela actresses
Mexican television actresses
Mexican television directors
Women television directors